W roli głównej... is a Polish television chat show presented by journalist Magda Mołek. Each programme is an interview with one special celebrity guest. The talks are often intimate and emotionally charged.

Episodes

Series 1

Series 2

Series 3

Series 4

Series 5

Series 6

Series 7

This was meant to be the last episode of the show as Mołek decided to leave it, though after much protest by viewers, the programme was renewed for its eight series a few months later.

Series 8

Series 9

Special episodes

Television talk shows